Eric Bodden (born 20 February 1980 in Aachen) is a German computer scientist. He holds the Chair of Secure Software Engineering at the Heinz Nixdorf Institute of the Paderborn University and is Director of Software Engineering and IT Security at the Fraunhofer Institute for Mechatronic Design (IEM). He is also head of the engineering department in the Collaborative Research Centre 1119 CROSSING at the Technical University of Darmstadt.

Career 
Bodden's undergraduate studies consist of a computer science degree at RWTH Aachen University. His thesis won the 2005 undergraduate category of the ACM Student Research Competition. From 2006 to 2009, Bodden did a PhD at McGill University.

From 2009 to 2015, Eric Bodden worked at the Technische Universität Darmstadt. Since the summer of 2013, Bodden has held a cooperative professorship at the Fraunhofer Institute for Secure Information Technology and the Technische Universität Darmstadt.

Since 2016, Bodden has worked at the Heinz Nixdorf Institute at the University of Paderborn and been a director for software engineering and IT security at the Fraunhofer Institute for Mechatronic Systems Design.

Bodden is a member of the BITKOM Management Club, Distinguished Member of the ACM and the Gesellschaft für Informatik.

Awards 
In 2014, Eric Bodden received the Heinz Maier Leibnitz Prize of the German Research Foundation. The Technische Universität Darmstadt team placed second in the 2014 German IT Security Award from the Horst Görtz Foundation and the first place in 2016. In 2019, Bodden was named an ACM Distinguished Scientist. Five of his publications have received the ACM Distinguished Paper Award.  Three of his previous doctoral students received the Ernst Denert Prize for Software Engineering.

Weblinks 
 Personal Website Eric Bodden
 Chair for Secure Software Engineering at the Heinz Nixdorf Institute
 Research Area of Software Engineering und IT Security at the Fraunhofer Institute for Mechatronic Systems Design

References

External links 
 Homepage Eric Bodden

German computer scientists
Academic staff of Paderborn University
Fraunhofer Society
1980 births
Living people